Gladys Edith McKay (20 February 1891 – 30 January 1963) was an Australian writer.

During World War I, McKay volunteered as a nurse and was sent overseas to Gallipoli and Serbia with the Scottish Women's Hospitals for Foreign Service.

McKay is best known for her 1947 novel "The House of Winston Blaker".

"The House of Winston Blaker" received mostly positive reviews nationally and was later adapted by the Australian Broadcasting Corporation as a radio serial.

McKay was also known for her short stories, written under the name of Edith Dithmack.  More than 120 of McKay's short stories were broadcast on ABC Radio in the 1940s.

In 1949, McKay won the ABC's short story competition in 1949 for Faith.

ABC Radio adapted another of McKay's works into a serial format in 1952. Unborn Tomorrow, inspired by the history of Kanaka labour on the Queensland sugarcane fields, was aired from Monday to Friday at 8:45am.

McKay was born in Rockhampton, and worked as a solicitor's clerk in Bundaberg before settling in the Boonah district.

See also
 Agnes Bennett
 Mabel Atkinson
 Elsie Inglis
 Jessie Ann Scott
 Olive Kelso King
 Mary de Garis

References 

1891 births
1963 deaths
People from Rockhampton
20th-century Australian women writers
20th-century Australian writers